Chaudhry Muhammed Farooq (November 1959 – 29 December 2002) was a member of the Punjab Assembly from 1988 to 1997, and again in 2002.  He was Minister for Law and Parliamentary Affairs during 1993–97, and the provincial president of PML.

Family 
He was from Chaach family of Sarai Alamgeer. As of 27 October 2016 his brother, Muhammad Arshad Chaudhry is part of Pakistan Tehreek E Insaf (PTI) and remained a member of the Provincial Assembly of the Punjab two times (2002-2007) (2008-2013).

His uncle Chaudhry Abdul Rahman remained Tehseel Nazim Sarai Alamgir two times and his father in law Sheikh Aftab Ahmed is Federal Minister in Nawaz Sharif Cabinet.

Death 
After Winning the 2002 general elections from his Constituency as an independent candidate with the highest number of votes ever. Farooq’s name was being taken for the most important ministry of Punjab. His rivals unable to digest their defeat, set up an ambush and martyred him by use of hired assassins. Two armed security guards did not have time to respond; they were killed, as were Farooq and his 3 friends. The investigation focused on a possible tribal feud and in fact it was a tribal feud between Rajput andJutt tribes .  .

References 

People from Gujrat District
Pakistan Muslim League (Q) politicians
1959 births
2002 deaths
Assassinated Pakistani politicians